List of representatives and senators of the Arizona Legislature by legislative districts after the 2020 redistricting.

Background 
Redistricting in Arizona occurs every 10 years and is conducted by the Arizona Independent Redistricting Commission. The first election using the newly drawn districts occurred on November 8, 2022.

A district map can be found here.

Arizona – by legislature

Arizona – by district 
† Member was appointed.

Arizona – 1st district – Prescott – Yavapai County – Black Canyon City

Arizona – 2nd district – North Phoenix – Desert View

Arizona – 3rd district – Cave Creek – Fountain Hills – New River

Arizona – 4th district – Paradise Valley – North Scottsdale

Arizona – 5th district – Phoenix East – Camelback East

Arizona – 6th district – North Flagstaff – Navajo County – Apache County

Arizona – 7th district – South Flagstaff – Gila County – Show Low

Arizona – 8th district – Tempe – South Scottsdale – Salt River Reservation

Arizona – 9th district – Mesa

Arizona – 10th district – East Mesa

Arizona – 11th district – South Phoenix – Laveen

Arizona – 12th district – South Tempe – Ahwatukee Foothills – West Chandler

Arizona – 13th district – Chandler

Arizona – 14th district – Gilbert

Arizona – 15th district – Queen Creek – San Tan Valley

Arizona – 16th district – Pinal County –  Casa Grande – Florence

Arizona – 17th district – Oro Valley –  Marana – Mount Lemmon

Arizona – 18th district – Catalina Foothills

Arizona – 19th district – Cochise County – Greenlee County – Safford

Arizona – 20th district – Tucson

Arizona – 21st district – East Tucson – Nogales

Arizona – 22nd district – Tolleson – Goodyear – Maryvale

Arizona – 23rd district – Maricopa County South-West – Yuma

Arizona – 24th district – Glendale – Maryvale

Arizona – 25th district – Buckeye – Yuma County

Arizona – 26th district – Phoenix West – Alhambra

Arizona – 27th district – Peoria – North Glendale

Arizona – 28th district – Sun City – Sun City West – Rio Vista

Arizona – 29th district – Surprise – Litchfield Park

Arizona – 30th district – La Paz County – Mohave County

See also 
 List of Representatives and Senators of Arizona Legislature by Districts (2013–2023)
 List of Representatives and Senators of Arizona Legislature by Districts (2003–2013)
 List of Arizona Legislative Districts

References 

 
State Legislature